Jack Bardoe  is an English actor who played Charles Pope in the ITV drama series Belgravia (2020). He also voiced Lanz in the English dub of Xenoblade Chronicles 3.

Education and training
Bardoe was a member of the National Youth Theatre, and undertook the Royal Academy of Dramatic Art (RADA) foundation course in acting (2014-2015), afterwards enrolling on a degree programme at RADA, and graduating in 2019.

Career

Film

Television

Theatre
2022 - Othello (play)|Roderigo, National Theatre [London]

Video games

References

External links
 
Jack Bardoe on Royal National Theatre

Living people
English male film actors
English male stage actors
English male television actors
20th-century English male actors
21st-century English male actors
Year of birth missing (living people)